The canton of Levroux is an administrative division of the Indre department, central France. Its borders were modified at the French canton reorganisation which came into effect in March 2015. Its seat is in Levroux.

It consists of the following communes:
 
Aize
Baudres
Bouges-le-Château
Bretagne
Brion
Buxeuil
La Champenoise
La Chapelle-Saint-Laurian
Coings
Diou
Fontenay
Francillon
Giroux
Guilly
Levroux
Liniez
Lizeray
Luçay-le-Libre
Ménétréols-sous-Vatan
Meunet-sur-Vatan
Moulins-sur-Céphons
Paudy
Reboursin
Reuilly
Rouvres-les-Bois
Saint-Aoustrille
Sainte-Lizaigne
Saint-Florentin
Saint-Maur (partly)
Saint-Pierre-de-Jards
Saint-Valentin
Vatan
Villegongis
Vineuil

References

Cantons of Indre